Denis Lanigan (24 July 1891 – 18 September 1966) was an Irish hurler who played as a left wing-back at senior level for the Limerick county team.

Born in Gortnahoe, County Tipperary, Lanigan first arrived on the inter-county scene at the age of twenty-two when he first linked up with the Limerick senior team. He made his senior debut in the 1916 Thomond Feis. Lanigan went on to play a key part for Limerick during a golden age for the team, and won two All-Ireland medals and three Munster medals. He was an All-Ireland runner-up on one occasion.

At club level Lanigan won five championship medals with Young Irelands.

His retirement came following the conclusion of the 1926 championship.

In retirement from playing, Lanigan became involved in the administrative affairs of the Gaelic Athletic Association. He served as secretary of the Limerick County Board as well as vice-president of the Munster Council. Lanigan also served as an inter-county referee.

Honours
Young Irelands
Limerick Senior Hurling Championship (5): 1920, 1922, 1928, 1930, 1932

Limerick
All-Ireland Senior Hurling Championship (2): 1918, 1921
Munster Senior Hurling Championship (3): 1918, 1921, 1923

References

1891 births
1966 deaths
All-Ireland Senior Hurling Championship Final referees
All-Ireland Senior Hurling Championship winners
Hurling backs
Hurling referees
Limerick County Board administrators
Limerick inter-county hurlers
Munster Provincial Council administrators
Secretaries of county boards of the Gaelic Athletic Association
Sportspeople from County Tipperary
Young Irelands (Limerick) hurlers